Isono (written: 磯野) is a Japanese surname. Notable people with the surname include:

, Japanese samurai
, Japanese comedian, entertainer and actress
, Japanese footballer
, Japanese samurai

Japanese-language surnames